Leandro Rodrigues Montebeler (born 6 April 1984) is a Brazilian football midfielder playing with Santa Quitéria.

Leandro Montebeler started his professional career with Paysandu in his homeland and later went on to play in Singapore, Serbia and Turkey.

He won the Campeonato Sul-Mato-Grossense with Águia Negra in 2012.

In 2013, Leandro Montebeler played with Ji-Paraná in the Campeonato Rondoniense.

He played with Vojvodina and Napredak Kruševac in the Serbian SuperLiga. He also had a spell in Turkey with Adapazarıspor. Then he returned to Brazil where he played, since 2012 onwards, with Águia Negra, Ji-Paraná, Castelo and Santa Quitéria.

References

External links
 

1984 births
Living people
Association football midfielders
Brazilian expatriate footballers
Brazilian expatriate sportspeople in Serbia
Brazilian expatriate sportspeople in Singapore
Brazilian expatriate sportspeople in Turkey
Brazilian footballers
Expatriate footballers in Serbia
Expatriate footballers in Singapore
Expatriate footballers in Turkey
FK Napredak Kruševac players
FK Vojvodina players
Serbian SuperLiga players
Paysandu Sport Club players
Clube Atlético Colatinense players
Grêmio Esportivo Glória players
Ji-Paraná Futebol Clube players